Heather Wahlquist (born May 23, 1977) is an American film and television actress. She was married to director/writer Nick Cassavetes and has appeared in several of his films.

Wahlquist was raised in Oklahoma, where she graduated from Seminole High School and studied psychology for two years at the University of Oklahoma.  She is the co-writer, with Cassavetes, of the motion picture Yellow (2012), and stars as a woman who returns to her native Oklahoma after running into problems in her life in Los Angeles.

Filmography

References

External links

1977 births
Living people
American film actresses
American television actresses
Actresses from Oklahoma City
People from Seminole, Oklahoma
University of Oklahoma alumni
Cassavetes family
20th-century American actresses
21st-century American actresses